A cupola is a recess, indentation, or cavity in the ceiling of a lava tube, a kind of cave formation. Cupolas may originate from partial collapse of the ceiling, inflation of the roof by gas or lava pressure, or from a roofed-over site of a former tube overflow. They can be situated anywhere in a lava tube but are most common in lower-level passages.

See also

References

Volcanic landforms
Cave geology